Catherine Feeney (or variants) is the name of:

Catherine Feeny (born 1976), American singer-songwriter
Catherine Feeney (musician) in Never the Bride
Katherine Feeney, known as Sally Forrest
Kathryn Feeney, guest on Dustin's Daily News
Katy Feeney on List of All Creatures Great and Small (TV series) characters